The Embassy of Belarus in Moscow is the chief diplomatic mission of Belarus in the Russian Federation. It is located at 17 Maroseika Street in the Basmanny District of Moscow.

The embassy is located in the former palace of count Pyotr Rumyantsev, built in 1782. After the October Revolution, the building was nationalized and later transferred to the government of the Belarusian Soviet Socialist Republic and hosted the official representation of the republic to the central government of the Soviet Union. After the dissolution of the Soviet Union, the official representation was transformed into the embassy of the independent Republic of Belarus.

Since the 1990s, the embassy has become a place for protests against the regime of Alexander Lukashenko by members of the Belarusian diaspora and their Russian supporters. In 2020 and 2021, numerous solidarity demonstrations with the protests in Belarus took place in front of the embassy.

See also 
 Belarus–Russia relations
 Diplomatic missions in Russia

References

External links 
  Embassy of Belarus in Moscow

Belarus–Russia relations
Belarus
Moscow
Cultural heritage monuments of regional significance in Moscow